Thinobius is a genus of beetles belonging to the family Staphylinidae.

The genus has almost cosmopolitan distribution.

Species:
 Thinobius afer Peyerimhoff, 1914 
 Thinobius agilis Sharp, 1887

References

Staphylinidae
Staphylinidae genera